The Binondo Central Bank (BCB) was a Filipino government dual exchange rate system that operated between 1983 and 1986.  It was established to allow the government to narrow the rate gap by directly intervening in black market currency prices.

The government of the Philippines organized the BCB under then Trade Secretary Roberto Ongpin, with a mandate to close the gap between the US dollar vs the Philippine Peso's official guiding rate and the black market rate. Ongpin was later charged with illegally acquiring Philippine pesos through the BCB but this case was dismissed in 2016.

History
The BCB was established in November 1983 at the time when the country is experiencing a debt crisis following the assassination of Benigno Aquino Jr. Financial institutions and banks were experiencing scarce foreign reserves at that particular period. It was organized by the Ferdinand Marcos government led by then Philippine Minister of Trade and Industry Roberto V. Ongpin with collaboration with other Filipino-Chinese businessmen.

Following the People Power Revolution, the organization was made defunct on February 26, 1986.

Forfeiture case
Ongpin was charged by the Presidential Commission on Good Government in July 1987 with illegally acquiring  through the BCB. The other named defendants of the case were Imelda Marcos, Fabian Ver, as well as five of Ver's children.

They were alleged by the government at that time to have used the BCB in buying millions of US dollars for deposit in foreign banks for their own gain. The marking of exhibits was completed in 2001 while Ongpin finished his presentation of evidence in 2007. In April 2009, Ongpin asked the Sandiganbayan to dismiss the case saying that the government has failed to prove that he used the organization for his financial gain or caused " grave and irreparable damage" to the government. He filed a motion for the closure of the forfeiture case' filed against him in December 2009.

The case was dismissed in a ruling by Sandiganbayan date January 19, 2016.

References

1986 disestablishments in the Philippines
Economic history of the Philippines
Presidency of Ferdinand Marcos
Philippine companies established in 1983
Banks established in 1983
Banks disestablished in 1986